Dr. Thomas Hannibal (died 1531) was an English judge who was Master of the Rolls between 1523 and 1527.

References

Year of birth unknown
1531 deaths
16th-century English judges
Masters of the Rolls